Japan Open Championship may refer to: 

Japan Open Golf Championship
Japan Open Tennis Championships

See also
Japan Open (disambiguation)
Japanese Championship (disambiguation)